Dave Cullen is an American journalist and non-fiction writer.

Life
Cullen graduated from the University of Illinois at Urbana–Champaign.

His work has appeared in The Daily Beast and Vanity Fair.

Works 

 Columbine, New York: Twelve, 2009. , 
Parkland: Birth of a Movement, New York: Harper Collins Publishers, 2019. ,

References

External links

"Dave Cullen, Author of “Parkland: Birth of a Movement”, Amanpour & Co. 02.14.2019 
“Columbine” and “Parkland” Author Dave Cullen: Data on mass murder shouldn’t exist, WGN, February 21, 2019.

Year of birth missing (living people)
Living people
University of Illinois Urbana-Champaign alumni
21st-century American journalists
21st-century American non-fiction writers
Place of birth missing (living people)